John Petty Fitzmaurice, 1st Earl of Shelburne PC (Ire) (1706 – 14 May 1761), known as John FitzMaurice until 1751 and as The Viscount FitzMaurice between 1751 and 1753, was an Anglo-Irish peer and politician. He was the father of William Petty FitzMaurice, Prime Minister of Great Britain from 1782 to 1783.

Life
Born John FitzMaurice, Lord Shelburne was the second son of Thomas FitzMaurice, 1st Earl of Kerry, and Anne, daughter of Sir William Petty (1623–1687). He was the younger brother of William FitzMaurice, 2nd Earl of Kerry, and the nephew of Charles Petty, 1st Baron Shelburne and Henry Petty, 1st Earl of Shelburne. He was educated at Westminster School and was called to the Bar, Middle Temple, in 1727.

In 1751 he succeeded to the estates of his uncle the Earl of Shelburne (who had died childless) and assumed by Act of Parliament the surname of Petty in lieu of his patronymic. Later the same year he was raised to the Peerage of Ireland as Baron Dunkeron and Viscount FitzMaurice. Two years later the earldom of Shelburne was revived in his favour when he was made Earl of Shelburne, in the County of Wexford, in the Irish peerage.

In 1754 he bought Bowood Park, an estate between Chippenham and Calne in Wiltshire, and rebuilt the mansion there.

Political career 
FitzMaurice was High Sheriff of Kerry in 1732. In 1743 he entered the Irish House of Commons as one of two representatives for County Kerry, a seat he held until 1751.

He was Governor of County Kerry in 1754 and the same year he was returned to the British House of Commons for Wycombe, a seat he held until 1760. He was sworn of the Irish Privy Council in 1754 and in 1760 he was created Lord Wycombe, Baron of Chipping Wycombe, in the County of Buckingham, in the Peerage of Great Britain, which entitled him to a seat in the English House of Lords.

Family
Lord Shelburne married his first cousin, Mary, daughter of the Hon. William FitzMaurice, in 1734. Their younger son the Hon. Thomas FitzMaurice married Mary O'Brien, later suo jure Countess of Orkney. Lord Shelburne died in May 1761 and was buried in Bowood, Wiltshire. He was succeeded in the earldom by his eldest son, William, who became Prime Minister of Great Britain and was created Marquess of Lansdowne in 1784. The Countess of Shelburne died in 1780.

References

|-

1706 births
1761 deaths
18th-century Anglo-Irish people
British MPs 1754–1761
Peers of Ireland created by George II
Peers of Great Britain created by George II
Fitzmaurice, John
Irish emigrants to Great Britain
Members of the Middle Temple
Members of the Privy Council of Ireland
People educated at Westminster School, London
Petty
John
High Sheriffs of Kerry
Members of the Parliament of Ireland (pre-1801) for County Kerry constituencies
Members of the Parliament of Great Britain for English constituencies
Parents of prime ministers of the United Kingdom
2